Jia Na Jaye is a Pakistani drama television series aired on Hum TV in 2013. It is produced by Momina Duraid under her home banner MD Productions and stars Fatima Effendi and Adeel Hussain in lead.

Plot
Saba's father marries her off to his brother’s notorious son Sadiq, because of his health conditions and uncertainty about his life. But her life becomes a living hell, and after much hardships she elopes from her house when she gets to know that her husband Sadiq wants to sell her off to some goons to take revenge from Saba's father who had chucked him out of his house due to his bad deeds. Saba has an accident while she was running away and meets a boy named Eqaan Siddiqui who helps her take her to hospital. Eqaan drops Saba at a place she asks him to and out of curiosity Eqaan asks her identity to which she lies that her name is Mariam.

Finally things get worse for Saba when Sadiq threatens to take her away and Saba and her mother had to leave Karachi to a city Hyderabad for their safety, Khurram who is their neighbor helps them sell their house and shift to Hyderabad. In city Hyderabad they start to live in their relatives house. Days go by and Saba gets to know that she is pregnant while her husband Sadiq meets with an accident from a car of a very rich woman named Shaila Gufran, he goes to meet her to express gratitude.

Eqaan's mother who is worried for his marriage asks him to give her the exact time he would want to get married, he gets annoyed and to avoid the topic and he tells her 4 years from now he would settle down.

After 2 years Saba has a child Mannal and lives with her mother in Hyderabad.

Eqaan on the other hand is still searching for Mariam the girl he met 2 years ago, but Raqshi who doesn't wish that Eqaan finds the girl whom he is in love spy's on him. Eqaan takes the help of an artist Imraan who sketches portray of the girl whom he describes, Raqshi tries to manipulate the artist to make her a copy of the sketch so that she can find the girl herself and make sure Eqaan does not reach the girl. But luckily Eqaan meets Saba's friend Sharmeen who recognizes Saba's portray but lies to Eqaan that the girl he is searching for is dead. Eqaan is devastated and gives in to his mothers decision of getting engaged to Raqshi after he attends his aunty Sarwat's daughters wedding which is commencing in Hyderabad coincidentally now where Saba lives.

On the other hand Sadiq who meets the woman Shaila, starts working for her to help her get the property of her husband Gufran, also avenging Shaila's boyfriend who cheats on her for her wealth finally Sadiq kills Shahid, Becomes a loyal right-hand man of Shaila as she starts sharing her story with him and telling him her long buried secrets.
 
Things are in favour of Eqaan when he accidentally again sees Mariam and follows her to her place and asks permission to meet him once. But Saba very rudely dismisses him. but he tells her that he will keep coming until she meets him once.

Saba's mother tells her that she got scared as she thought Sadiq was following them as they were running away from the market, Saba tells her mother that the boy's name is Eqaan and he had helped her once but she doesn't want to meet anyone from her past and wants to reveal her dark past life which she's left behind.

Eqaan finally meets Saba in Sarwat aunty's daughter's wedding ceremony, takes a cousins help to meet Saba, he expresses his liking for her but she is not flattered and snubs him. Saba's mother asks her to accept Eqaan's proposal but she is worried for Mannal whom she doesn't wish to leave behind. But Saba's mother asks her to treat Mannal as her sister and not a daughter if she wants Eqaan to easily accept her in his life.

Finally after a lot of discussions Saba agrees to marry Eqaan and they have a simple Nikah ceremony. Eqaan's mother keeps asking him when he's coming back as they are waiting for his engagement with Raqshi, and Eqaan tells him he will be coming soon.

Eqaan comes home but to his parents dismay he has come back with a wife, at beginning they oppose his decision but finally asks him to stay back when he threatens to leave the house with Saba. Raqshi is heartbroken and tells all this to her parents to which her father strongly reacts that he would not spare Eqaan and his parents and take away his financial support from the business and bring them on roads, but Raqshi requests not to take harsh steps.

Gradually Saba makes a place in Eqaan's parents hearts and starts to live a blissful married life. But in some time she starts missing her daughter Mannal and requests Eqaan to get them back to stay in the city with them, Eqaan agrees.

Raqshi plans to create misunderstandings between Saba and Eqaan regarding her name Mariam and also tells the same to Eqaan's mother, and also invite them for dinner get together but soon Saba finds herself in dilemma when Mannal gets ill, because Eqaan doesn't like to stay without her, but he does give her permission to stay for a night to take care of Mannal.

Eqaan finds Saba's concern for Mannal very strange and expresses that he feels dejected when he sees her caring towards someone else. Saba also has a fear at the back of her mind that if Eqaan knew that Mannal is not her sister but daughter he would leave her at alter and also has a nightmare.

Sadiq and Shaila now have become really dependent on each other emotionally and Shaila being a very clever person doesn't trust Sadiq as a partner still but does have a place for him as a loyal confidant, one day Shahid's girl friend Zoobi calls to blackmail them as she has photographic evidence of Sadiq killing Shahid and demands 2 crores. Sadiq gives Shaila a way to solve the problem by kidnapping Zoobi and finding the evidence.

Cast 
 Imran Aslam
 Fatima Effendi as Saba
 Adeel Hussain as Eqan, Saba's second husband.
 Maira Khan
 Fazila Qazi as Saba's mother.
 Shabbir Jan as Saba's father.
 Azra Mohyeddin as Eqan's mother.
 Shehryar Zaidi as Eqan's father.
 Hina Javed as Shermeen

References

External links 
 Official website
 

Pakistani television series